The 1998 du Maurier Open women's singles was the women's singles event of the one hundred and ninth edition of the Canadian Open; a WTA Tier I tournament and the most prestigious women's tennis tournament held in Canada. Monica Seles was the defending champion and won in the final 6–3, 6–2 against Arantxa Sánchez Vicario.

Seeds
A champion seed is indicated in bold text while text in italics indicates the round in which that seed was eliminated. The top nine seeds received a bye to the second round.

  Martina Hingis (semifinals)
  Jana Novotná (semifinals)
  Arantxa Sánchez Vicario (final)
 n/a
  Monica Seles (champion)
  Conchita Martínez (quarterfinals)
  Steffi Graf (third round)
  Amanda Coetzer (third round)
  Irina Spîrlea (third round)
  Patty Schnyder (first round)
  Nathalie Tauziat (third round)
  Dominique Van Roost (second round)
  Mary Pierce (first round)
  Sandrine Testud (quarterfinals)
  Anna Kournikova (third round)
  Ai Sugiyama (third round)
  Lisa Raymond (first round)

Draw

Finals

Top half

Section 1

Section 2

Bottom half

Section 3

Section 4

References
 1998 du Maurier Open Draw

Singles